The Hope Professor of Zoology (Entomology) is a professorship at Oxford University.  The first Hope Professor was John Obadiah Westwood.  The current holder is Geraldine Wright.  The position is associated with a professorial fellowship at Jesus College.

List of holders

 John Obadiah Westwood (1860–93)
 Edward Bagnall Poulton (1893–1933)
 Geoffrey Douglas Hale Carpenter (1933–48)
 George Copley Varley  (1948–80)
 David Spencer Smith (1980–95)
 Vacant
 Hugh Charles Jonathan Godfray (2006-2018)
 Geraldine Wright (2021–present)

References

Professorships at the University of Oxford
Professorships in zoology
Lists of people associated with the University of Oxford
Jesus College, Oxford